XHTS-FM is a radio station on 102.9 FM in Veracruz, Veracruz. It is owned by Grupo Pazos Radio and is known as Ya! FM with a pop format.

History
XHTS received its concession on June 13, 1972. It was owned by Vicente Capillo Rocha with an ERP of 28 kW. It was sold to Radio Tipo in 1983.

References

Radio stations in Veracruz
Radio stations established in 1972